Toplumcu Kurtuluş Partisi may refer to:

Communal Liberation Party (Toplumcu Kurtuluş Partisi), a political party in Northern Cyprus.
Socialist Liberation Party (Toplumcu Kurtuluş Partisi), a political party in Turkey.